Francesco Biondi (1735–1805), or Anton Francesco Biondi, was an Italian Neoclassical painter, who was born and died in Milan. He painted sacred subjects, was a pupil of Andrea Porta, and painted a number of portraits for the Ospedale Maggiore of Milan.

References

1735 births
1805 deaths
18th-century Italian painters
Italian male painters
19th-century Italian painters
Painters from Milan
19th-century Italian male artists
18th-century Italian male artists